Norman Lebrecht (born 11 July 1948) is a British music journalist and author who specializes in classical music. He is best known as the owner of the classical music blog, Slipped Disc, where he frequently publishes articles. Unlike other writers on music, Lebrecht rarely reviews concerts or recordings, preferring to report on the people and organizations who engage in classical music. Described by Gilbert Kaplan as "surely the most controversial and arguably the most influential journalist covering classical music", his writings have been praised as entertaining and revealing, while others have accused them of sensationalism and criticized their inaccuracies.

He was a columnist for The Daily Telegraph from 1994 to 2002, and assistant editor of the London Evening Standard from 2002 to 2009.  On BBC Radio 3, Lebrecht presented lebrecht.live beginning in 2000, and The Lebrecht Interview from 2006 to 2016. He also wrote a column for the magazine Standpoint, which ceased publication in 2021. 

In additions to writings on the classical music industry, Lebrecht has written 12 books on music and novels The Song of Names (2001) and The Game of Opposites: A Novel (2009). The former won a 2002 Whitbread Award and was adapted into a film of the same name directed by François Girard. A work of social history, Genius and Anxiety: How Jews Changed the World, 1847–1947 was published in 2019.

Early life and music journalism
Norman Lebrecht was born on 11 July 1948 in London, England, to Soloman and Marguerite Lebrecht. He attended Hasmonean Grammar School in London, citing Solomon Schonfeld as a childhood role model. From 1964 to 1965, Lebrecht attended Kol Torah Rabbinical College, a yeshiva school in Israel, and then Bar-Ilan University in Ramat Gan (1966–1968) and Hebrew University in Jerusalem. Following his graduation, from 1970 to 1972 Lebrecht worked at the Kol Yisrael news department, part of the Israel Broadcasting Authority. He returned to London in 1972, where he was a news executive Visnews Ltd. from 1973 to 1978. In 1977 Lebrecht married the sculptor and writer Elbie Spivack; the couple has three daughters.

Beginning in 1982, he was a special contributor to The Sunday Times until 1991. The 1980s saw the publication of various books on music by Lebrecht: Discord: Conflict and the Making of Music (1982), The Book of Musical Anecdotes (1985), Mahler Remembered (1987), and A Musical Book of Days (1987). Following his leave from The Sunday Times, Lebrecht released The Maestro Myth: Great Conductors in Pursuit of Power (1991), which charts the history of conducting, from its rise as an independent profession in the 1870s to its subsequent and purposed preoccupations with power, wealth, and celebrity. The following year he released two books: Music in London (1992), as well as The Companion to 20th-Century Music (1992). In 1993 he became a music columnist for The Daily Telegraph in Britain, holding the post until 2002. During this time he released wrote When the Music Stops: Managers, Maestros and the Corporate Murder of Classical Music (1996), a history of the classical music business, presenting an exposé of its backstage workings and predicting the collapse of the record industry. Herman Trotter of The Buffalo News wrote that Lebrecht's "widely discussed 1992 book "The Maestro Myth" seems to have been a warm-up for his current magnum opus." He also published Covent Garden: The Untold Story: Dispatches from the English Culture War, 1945–2000 (2000), covering the history of the Royal Opera House. Beginning in 2000, he presented lebrecht.live (a cultural debate forum where "issues in the arts are debated and hotly disputed by makers and consumers of culture") on BBC Radio 3, whose output centres on classical music and opera.

Other books and broadcasts
His career as a novelist began in 2002 with The Song of Names (2002), a tale of two boys growing up in wartime London and the impact of the Holocaust. It was published in 2001, and went on to win the 2002 Whitbread Award for First Novel. Lebrecht won the award at the age of 54.  Also in 2002 he was an arts columnist and assistant editor of the Evening Standard, writing a weekly column until 2015. Gilbert Kaplan wrote that "From his perch in London he has covered and uncovered the classical music world in his full-page weekly column in the Evening Standard which through the internet is must-reading around the world ... concentrating on reporting on the organizations and the people managing – or as he often sees it, mismanaging – the classical music world as well as the stars who dominate this culture. All this with a sensibility normally associated with a political reporter or even a police reporter. He was the first to predict the demise of the major classical record companies – now documented in his recently released book The Life and Death of Classical Music."

From 2006 until 2016 he hosted The Lebrecht Interview ("Classical music critic Norman Lebrecht talks to major figures in the field"), also on BBC Radio 3. Lebrecht in 2007 launched his classical music blog Slipped Disc, for which he writes. It attracts over one million readers per month. He also wrote a monthly column for the culture magazine Standpoint, which ceased publication in 2021.

His 2007 book Maestros, Masterpieces and Madness: The Secret Life and Shameful Death of the Classical Record Industry (US title: The Life and Death of Classical Music) was billed as an inside account of the rise and fall of recording, combined with a critical selection and analysis of 100 albums and 20 recording disasters. The book, however, was withdrawn from the market after its publisher discovered that it contained numerous libelous claims. In 2007 the founder of Naxos Records, Klaus Heymann, sued Lebrecht's publisher, Penguin Books, for defamation in London's High Court of Justice. Heymann claimed that Lebrecht had wrongly accused him of "serious business malpractices" in his book Maestros, Masterpieces and Madness, and identified at least 15 statements he claimed were inaccurate. The case was settled out of court. As a result of the settlement, Penguin issued a statement acknowledging the baselessness of Lebrecht's accusations and apologising for "the hurt and damage which [Heymann] has suffered". The publisher also agreed to pay an undisclosed sum in legal fees to Heymann, to make a donation to charity, to refrain from repeating the disputed allegations and to seek the return of all unsold copies of Lebrecht's book. Commenting on the affair, Heymann said: "For me it's beyond belief how any journalist in five pages can make so many factual mistakes. It's shocking. Also, he [Lebrecht] really doesn't understand the record business." The settlement did not extend to the US edition of Lebrecht's book.

Slipped Disc
In the early blogosphere, Lebrecht was critical of some online trends, arguing in his Evening Standard column that "Until bloggers deliver hard facts [...] paid-for newspapers will continue to set the standard as the only show in town". One blogger used this statement to charge Lebrecht with hypocrisy in light of the Naxos lawsuit.

Despite this criticism of classical music blogs, Lebrecht launched his own, Slipped Disc, in March 2007, as part of ArtsJournal.com. In 2014, his blog became a standalone commercial website, supported by advertising and promotions. The blog primarily focuses on classical music industry gossip. When asked by one interviewer whether he found such gossip interesting personally or whether he covered it for the sake of viewership, Lebrecht confirmed that the gossip

Recent books and adaptations
His second book on Mahler, Why Mahler?: How One Man and Ten Symphonies Changed Our World was published in 2010. In 2014, Lebrecht received the Cremona Music Award from Mondomusica and Cremona Pianoforte in the Communication category, citing that book, and his other books and articles, and recognizing his "commitment ... to the diffusion of the music culture at a global level."

The Song of Names, a feature film based on the 2002 novel, was released in 2019. Directed by François Girard, it stars Tim Roth and Clive Owen.

Another novel, The Game of Opposites: A Novel (Knopf Doubleday Publishing Group), was published in 2009 in the US. 

Lebrecht published a work of social history titled Genius and Anxiety: How Jews Changed the World, 1847–1947 by Oneworld (UK) in October 2019 and by Simon & Schuster (USA) in December 2019. David Crane in The Spectator called it "Norman Lebrecht's urgent and moving history." Rebecca Abrams in the Financial Times described the book as "[i]mpressively wide-ranging in scope and unflaggingly fascinating in detail". Tanjil Rashid wrote in The Times: "Claims to have 'changed the world' tend to be exaggerations, but Lebrecht's subtitle, How Jews Changed the World 1847–1947, seems understated. The world wasn't changed, it was remade." Mark Glanville wrote in The Times Literary Supplement: "Lebrecht's book is an extended meditation on the question of what it is about Jews that has enabled them to change the world in so many different ways. He guides us through his chosen period (1847–1947) in a breathless present continuous, with an enthusiasm that holds the reader's attention. Besides major, familiar figures, such as Einstein, Freud, Marx, Proust and Schoenberg, his kaleidoscope of characters includes Rosalind Franklin, whose important work on the double helix has still not been fully recognized; Leo Szilard, who split the atom; and Albert Ballin, to whom Lebrecht attributes the invention of the hamburger."

Critical reception
Lebrecht's polemical writings have drawn strong and diverse responses; Gilbert Kaplan described him in 2007 as "surely the most controversial and arguably the most influential journalist covering classical music." Robert Craft praised The Maestro Myth as an "exposé of the business practices of orchestral conducting [that] is likely to be the most widely read classical music book of the year". The American composer Gunther Schuller, in his 1998 book The Compleat Conductor, described The Maestro Myth in these terms: "A remarkably knowledgeable and courageous, no-holds-barred exposé of the serious degradation and venality in the conducting business, the wheeling and dealing of the power-broking managements that control most of the music business." Schuller went on to say: "It is sobering reading, to say the least, and is highly recommended to anyone concerned about the integrity of the art and profession of music." On the other hand, music critic Michael White described the book as merely "a compendium of gossip about who earns what and slept with whom to get it." Lebrecht himself was described by musicologist Richard Taruskin as "a sloppy but entertaining British muckraker". Several journalists have noted multiple misstatements of fact by Lebrecht:

 John von Rhein, Chicago Tribune:

 Roger Dettmer, The Baltimore Sun:

 Martin Bernheimer, Los Angeles Times:

An anonymous informant identified as "one of the world's leading conductors" told The Independent that Lebrecht had for years been getting away with "pompous, preposterous judgment" and "inept research". Upon being awarded the 2015 Cremona Music Award, Pianist Grigory Sokolov, refused to accept the honour, making this statement on his website: "According to my ideas about elementary decency, it is shame to be in the same award-winners list with Lebrecht".

Selected bibliography
 
  Also published as Hush! Handel's in a Passion: tales of Bach, Handel, and their contemporaries
 
 
 
 
 
  Also published as Who Killed Classical Music?: Maestros, Managers, and Corporate Politics
 
 
  Also published as The Life and Death of Classical Music: Featuring The 100 Best and 20 Worst Recordings Ever Made

References

Further reading
 The Economist (8 July 2010). "Gustav Mahler: The agony and the ecstasy". Retrieved 8 October 2014.
 Botstein, Leon (9 October 2010). "Bookshelf: A Fierce Enthusiasm". The Wall Street Journal. Retrieved 8 October 2014.

External links 
 
 Slipped Disc, Lebrecht's blog
 BBC Radio 3 – Lebrecht Interview series

1948 births
Living people
21st-century English novelists
Bar-Ilan University alumni
BBC Radio 3 presenters
Classical music critics
Costa Book Award winners
English Jews
English male journalists
English music critics
English radio personalities
Writers from London
English male novelists
The Daily Telegraph people
London Evening Standard people
The Sunday Times people
20th-century English non-fiction writers
Gossip columnists